The Ancestors is an album by Tim Berne and which was released on the Italian-based Soul Note label in 1983. It features three lengthy tracks which, typical of Berne, are structured in suite-like sections. The music is performed by the Tim Berne Sextet which consisted of Berne, Herb Robertson, Ray Anderson, Mack Goldsbury, Ed Schuller, Paul Motian.

Reception

The Penguin Guide to Jazz said "The Ancestors was a first sign that Berne was willing to slow down, look about him and take stock. ...it's a measured authoritative set, rhythmically coherent ".

Track listing 
 "Sirius B" (Berne) - 10:46
 "Shirley's Song - Part 1" (Berne) - 12:46
 "Shirley's Song - Part 2 / San Antonio / The Ancestors" (Berne) - 21:05

Personnel 
 Tim Berne: Alto saxophone
 Clarence Herb Robertson: Trumpet, pocket trumpet, cornet & flugelhorn
 Ray Anderson: Trombone & tuba
 Mack Goldsbury: Tenor & soprano saxophones
 Ed Schuller: Bass
 Paul Motian: Percussion

Notes 
 Recorded live on February 19, 1983, at the School of Visual Arts, NYC.
 Recording Engineer: Kazunori Sugiyama
 Produced by Empire Productions & Giovanni Bonandrini
 Cover painting by Betsy Berne

Releases 
 1983 - Soul Note (Italy), SN 1061 (LP) 
 1991 - Soul Note (Italy), 121061-1 (LP) 
 1991 - Soul Note (Italy), 121061-2 (CD) 
 1991 - Soul Note (Italy), 121061-4 (CT)

References

External links 
 [ All-Music album review]

1983 albums
Tim Berne albums